Taqpangajuk was an attempted Inuit resettlement located at Singer Inlet,  southwest of Killiniq in Quebec, northeastern Canada. The settlement was created in the 1980s as part of a relocation program from Killiniq. Its forecast population in 2010 was 432 people. In the winter of 1987, several displaced Killiniq families established a new community at Taqpangajuk without government assistance. However, the settlement failed, because of a lack of services and education, making it too difficult.

References

Former populated places in Quebec